"Me Without You" is a song by British R&B singer Loick Essien. The song was released in the United Kingdom on 4 November 2011 through Sony Music Entertainment as the fourth single from the upcoming studio album, Identity (2012). The track was written by Essien, Adam Argyle and Dee Adam and produced by Mike Spencer. On 11 November 2011 "Me Without You" debuted at number fourteen on the UK Singles Chart; having sold 23,962 copies in its first week.

Background
Discussing the song, Loick admitted: "There's nothing worse than ending a relationship with someone you don't want to break up with. This song is about trying to rebuild your life when it feels like you can't go on without them. Everyone has felt like that at some point and it's something we can all relate to."

Music video
A music video to accompany the release of "Me Without You" was first released onto YouTube on 11 October 2011 at a total length of Four minutes.

Track listing

Charts

Chart performance
Having been released on 4 November 2011 in the United Kingdom, "Me Without You" made its first chart appearance on 11 November at number fourteen; having sold 23,962 copies. The track also appeared as the fourth highest-selling song of the week, and charted as such on the UK R&B Chart. On its second week charting, the track fell eight places to number twenty-two.

Release history

References

2011 singles
Loick Essien songs
Songs written by Adam Argyle
2011 songs
Sony Music singles
Songs written by Loick Essien